Dreamlike is the fourth extended play by South Korean boy group the Boyz. It was released on August 19, 2019, through Cre.ker Entertainment. The EP consists of six tracks. It is also served as the group's final release to feature the member Hwall before his departure from the group in October 2019.

Background 
The Boyz released their fourth extended play Dreamlike and its lead single "D.D.D" on August 19.

Track listing

Charts

Release history

References 

2019 EPs
The Boyz (South Korean band) EPs